The men's fighting 77 kg competition in ju-jitsu at the 2022 World Games took place on 15 July 2022 at the Birmingham Southern College in Birmingham, United States.

Results

Elimination round

Group A

Group B

Finals

References

Ju-jitsu at the 2022 World Games